William B. Kannel (December 13, 1923 in Brooklyn – August 20, 2011) was a former director of the Framingham Heart Study and a former head of the American Heart Association's Council of Epidemiology. He was among the recipients of the 1976 Gairdner Foundation International Award.

References 

American cardiologists
American public health doctors
20th-century American physicians
Boston University faculty
People from Brooklyn
1923 births
2011 deaths